The 711th Infantry Division was a division of the People's Army of Vietnam (PAVN), first formed in early 1972.

Vietnam War
The Division was initially formed from the 31st and 32nd Regiments in early 1972 and the 97th Regiment was added to it in May 1972.

A dozen BGM-71 TOW missiles were left with abandoned equipment and fell into PAVN hands. The ARVN 4th Regiment recaptured Ross on 9 September 1972.

In the 1975 Spring Offensive on the morning of 24 March the Division, backed by armored elements, seized Tam Kỳ, driving the population north toward Da Nang.

References

Infantry divisions of Vietnam
Divisions of the People's Army of Vietnam
Military units and formations established in 1972